Conasprella sauros is a species of sea snail, a marine gastropod mollusk in the family Conidae, the cone snails and their allies.

Description
The size of the shell attains 30 mm.

Distribution
This marine species occurs from Louisiana, United States to Campeche, Mexico

References

  Puillandre N., Duda T.F., Meyer C., Olivera B.M. & Bouchet P. (2015). One, four or 100 genera? A new classification of the cone snails. Journal of Molluscan Studies. 81: 1-23

External links
 To Encyclopedia of Life
 To World Register of Marine Species
 

sauros
Gastropods described in 2006